Ben Jones (born 21 February 1983) is an English rugby union who played for Worcester Warriors in the Guinness Premiership in the 2008/09 season. He currently plays for Birmingham & Solihull.

Ben was a member of the England Sevens squad during the 2008/2009 season.

He plays as a scrum-half.

External links
 Worcester Warriors profile

1983 births
Living people
Worcester Warriors players
People educated at Barnard Castle School